Hearts and Sparks is a 1916 American silent comedy film directed by Clarence G. Badger and starring Gloria Swanson.

Cast
 Billie Bennett
 Nick Cogley
 Albert T. Gillespie
 Tom Kennedy
 Joe Lee
 Hank Mann
 Slim Summerville
 Gloria Swanson
 Bobby Vernon - Bobby

References

External links

1916 films
1916 short films
American silent short films
American black-and-white films
1916 comedy films
Films directed by Clarence G. Badger
Keystone Studios films
Films produced by Mack Sennett
Silent American comedy films
American comedy short films
1910s American films